The 2009–10 Nebraska Cornhuskers women's basketball team represented the University of Nebraska in the 2009–10 NCAA Division I women's basketball season. The Cornhuskers, a member of the Big 12 Conference, were coached by Connie Yori, and completed the regular season unbeaten at 29–0. However, they lost in the semifinals of the Big 12 Tournament to Texas A&M. Their season ended in the semifinals of the Kansas City Regional of the NCAA tournament, where they lost 76–67 to Kentucky.

Offseason
 The Huskers will welcome three incoming freshmen to the program. The rookies will be led by 2009 Washington High School Player-of-the-Year Lindsey Moore. The 5-9 point guard from Kentwood High School in Covington, Washington. She earned third-team All-America honors from Parade Magazine after leading the Conquerors to the Class 4A state title and a final No. 2 national ranking in the USA Today Super 25 poll. California forward Meghin Williams and Minnesota forward Katya Leick are the other freshmen.
 May 7: Nebraska incoming freshman Lindsey Moore will be one of the nation's top 19-and-under players invited to the USA Basketball Women's U19 National Team Trials next week.
Senior Kelsey Griffin was chosen as a preseason All-Big 12 selection by the league coaches for the third consecutive season.
Nebraska was picked to finish sixth in the powerful Big 12 Conference in voting by the league's coaches announced on Thursday, Oct. 15, by the conference office in Irving, Texas.
Nebraska's Kelsey Griffin was officially named one of 30 candidates for the prestigious Lowe's Senior CLASS award on Wednesday, Nov. 4, honoring women's basketball players across the nation who excel both on and off the court.

Roster

Schedule

Preseason exhibitions

Regular season

Postseason

Player stats

Awards and honors

Players
 Big 12 Player of the Year — Kelsey Griffin
 Big 12 Defensive Player of the Year — Yvonne Turner (with Brittney Griner of Baylor)
 First-team All-Big 12 — Griffin (unanimous selection), Cory Montgomery, and Turner
 Lowe's Senior CLASS Award — Kelsey Griffin

Coach
All of the following were awarded to head coach Connie Yori:
 Naismith College Coach of the Year
 Big 12 Coach of the Year
 WBCA National Coach of the Year
 Kay Yow National Coach of the Year Award

Rankings

Team players drafted into the WNBA

See also
Nebraska Cornhuskers

References

External links
Official Site

Nebraska Cornhuskers women's basketball seasons
Nebraska
Nebraska
Cornhusk
Cornhusk